Boris Levit-Broun  is a Russian poet, writer, artist.

Biography 
Boris Levit-Broun - Russian poet, writer, artist, was born on July 9, 1950 in Kiev. Parents: Mother – Mira Raiz, a classical pianist and teacher, she has been living in Germany since 1989 and still gives concerts. Father - Leonid Levit-Broun, a master of chamber photo portrait, photographer and artist, he was widely known in the 70–90 years in Ukraine and Russia.
Being brought up in a family of soviet Jewish intellectuals in an atmosphere saturated with cultural and artistic interests (music, literature, painting) determined the early propensity of Boris Levit-Broun to the humanitarian sphere.

Education
In 1967, Boris Levit-Broun graduated from high school and tried unsuccessfully to enter the Department of History of Art, faculty of the Moscow State University. The same year Boris Levit-Broun entered the Faculty of History and Theory of Art of the Kiev State Institute of Fine Arts, where he studied until 1973. In the spring of 1973, just before the discussion of his thesis, reviewed by a diploma about the portrait work of Nikolai Ge, Boris Levit-Broun was expelled from the Kiev State Art Institute on trumped ideological "cause."

Creative activities  
From 1973-1975. Boris Levit-Broun served in the Soviet Army in the Far East, where he began to write poetry. Demobilized and returned to Kiev, has ceased to care for poetry for 10 years. He worked in a photo lab, as photographer, later he became a jazz drummer and singer. From 1980 to 1988 he taught technique of playing the drums in a jazz school in Kiev. In 1984 he returned to poetry, to which until then he had not devoted a serious study. In 1986 he was invited as a leader vocalist in the jazz ensemble of Vladimir Karpovich at the Kiev House of Scientists, with whom he works up to the emigration.

In 1989 he wrote his first major prose, the story "Anketa" ("About me"). In May of the same year he emigrated to Germany, where he spent the next six years. There, starting from 1991, he began to write religious and philosophical prose. The first book of poetry by Boris Levit-Broun "Požiznennyj dnevnik" ("Lifelong Diary") has been published in Kyiv in 1993, by the editor VIR (see below). Later, Boris Levit-Broun managed to find editors in St. Petersburg, so all of his later publications are related to Russia. 
Since 1998, he is continuously published by the editor Aleteja in St. Petersburg.

Since 1996, Boris Levit-Broun and his wife live in Italy, in the city of Verona. Recently his works started being translated in foreign languages: a Russian-Rumanian bilingual edition of his poetry was released in 2011, and a Russian-English bilingual book of his prose – in 2012.

The scope of his creative activities is very wide: poetry, prose, religious philosophy, graphics, photography. In Italy it was released the album of the erotic drawings by Boris Levit-Broun «HOMO EROTIKUS» 1997. In recent years, Boris Levit-Broun became known as a jazz singer under the stage name of Boris Lebron. Since 2008, he has actively recorded in the studio Emotion Records by Fabio Cobelli, Verona.
Boris Levit-Broun is a member of the Union of Writers of the twenty-first century. He is regularly published in the following periodicals: "Deti Ra" (Children Ra), "Futurum Art", "Zinziver", "Kreščatik", as well as web-publications: "PERSONA plus", "Relga" and "Zarubežnye Zadvorki" (Foreign Backyards).

Works

Poetry 
 «Пожизненный дневник» ("Lifelong Diary" 270 p.)…1993 г. Киев, изд. ВИР, 
 «Вердикт» ("Verdict" 246 p.)...1996 г. СПб, изд. Петрополь, 
 «Строфы греховной лирики» ("Verses of a sinful lyrics" 62 p.)…1999 г. СПб, изд. Алетейя, (edit. Aletheia spb)  
 «Терзания и жалобы» ("Torments and lamentations" 248 p.)…2000 г. СПб, изд. Алетейя, (edit. Aletheia spb)  
 «Лишний росток бытия» ("Superfluous sprout of being" 361 p.)…2001 г. СПб, изд. Алетейя, (edit. Aletheia spb)  
 "Сквозь строи смятых строк" ("Through the formations of rumpled lines" - Russian-Romanian bilingual– poetry 185 p.)..2011 г.  Editura Fundatiei Culturale Poezia,IASI, 
 "Три" (книга трёх поэтов: Б.Левита-Броуна, А. Красниковой, Б. Марковского 255 с.)... 2014 г. СПб, изд. Алетейя, (edit. Aletheia spb)  
 "Последний успех" ("The last success")...2016 г. СПб, изд. Алетейя, (edit. Aletheia spb)

Philosophical prose 
 «На Бога надейся…» ("On God rely…" 355 p.)…1998 г. СПб, изд. Алетейя, (edit. Aletheia spb)  
 «Рама судьбы» ("The frame of destiny" 337 p.)…2000 г. СПб, изд. Алетейя, (edit. Aletheia spb)  
 «Зло и Спасение» ("Evil and Salvation" 560 p.)…2010 г. Спб, изд. Алетейя, (edit. Aletheia spb)

Fiction 
 «…Чего же боле?» ("What’s more to it?" – novel 573 p.)…2002 г. СПб, изд. Алетейя, (edit. Aletheia spb)  
 «Внутри Х/Б» ("Inside the camouflage" – novel 280 p.)…2005 г. СПб, изд. Алетейя, (edit. Aletheia spb)  
 «Три марша» ("Three stair flights" – collection of short prose 320 p.)….2009 г. СПб, изд. Алетейя, (edit. Aletheia spb)  
 "Вынужденная исповедь" ("A forced confession" – Russian-English bilingual – prose 230 p.), 2012 г. Charles Schlacks Publishers (Idyllwild, California),  
 "Человек со свойствами" ("A man with qualities" - novel 580 p.) 2016 г. СПб. изд. Алетейя(edit. Aletheia spb) .
 "Антони Гауди. Зодчий Храма" ("Antony Gaudi. Architect of a temple" - novel 270 p.), 2020, СПб, изд. Алетейя, (edit. Aletheia spb)

Dramatic works 
 "Antidot" (a comedy for theatre and cinema 170 p.), написана совместно с Ириной Соловей ..2012 г. ZA-ZA Verlag (Düsseldorf, Deutschland),

Graphics 
 «HOMO EROTIKUS» (an album of erotic drawings by B. Levit-Broun - 100 drawings)  CIERRE-grafica,Verona,Italia, 1997.
 "AGONY & PASSION" (collection of drawings of the youthful period)  EDIZIONI 03,Verona,Italia 2018.  https://www.edizioni03.com/ecomm_files/preview.asp?i=632

References

External links 
 Official site as a writer
 Official site as a jazz singer

BORIS LEVIT-BROUN READS HIS POEMS (listen)
https://www.youtube.com/watch?v=bxp2gWdvEqo 
https://www.youtube.com/watch?v=GiH7AZCFHXI
https://www.youtube.com/watch?v=1Q6dcp62sSE
https://www.youtube.com/watch?v=F5stmzk5XoU&t=1s
https://www.youtube.com/watch?v=txUxwJLOW2E
https://www.youtube.com/watch?v=ZEyt5B5UsXk&t=25s
https://www.youtube.com/watch?v=2MMrRMYiphg
https://www.youtube.com/watch?v=covG1QRmiqo
https://www.youtube.com/watch?v=sx0UijTkGZE
https://www.youtube.com/watch?v=5Jp4QnQ1AZs
https://www.youtube.com/watch?v=KksQQbowlbM&t=444s
https://www.youtube.com/watch?v=uMfqYnWKI_Q&t=58s
https://www.youtube.com/watch?v=HutMgsxOZr0
https://www.youtube.com/watch?v=AkMNYCXkXsw
https://www.youtube.com/watch?v=qXQgK7Qyol0&t=30s
https://www.youtube.com/watch?v=64Cx6JyX3Gk
https://www.youtube.com/watch?v=mM-kNQtxIls
https://www.youtube.com/watch?v=K0XhCveoWEY
https://www.youtube.com/watch?v=INpJ3zdEzJE
https://www.youtube.com/watch?v=INpJ3zdEzJE
https://www.youtube.com/watch?v=02Rvf2eJrbs

1950 births
Living people
Russian male poets
Russian male novelists